Howard Andrew Spiva (February 6, 1955 – April 3, 1979) was an American football player for the Atlanta Falcons of the National Football League (NFL). He appeared in 13 games for the Falcons in 1977. He was killed in a car accident. Teammate Garth TenNapel was in the same vehicle and was seriously injured.

Biography
Spiva was born on February 6, 1955, in Chattanooga, Tennessee. He attended Chamblee High School in Chamblee, Georgia and the University of Tennessee. At Tennessee, Spiva was a two-time All-Southeastern Conference selection. He was drafted by the St. Louis Cardinals in the fifth round of the 1977 NFL draft.

Spiva was released by St. Louis that year when the team made its final preseason cuts. He was signed by the Atlanta Falcons shortly thereafter. Falcons coach Leeman Bennett said that the team had become impressed with Spiva when they played Spiva and the Cardinals in a preseason game.

He played in 13 games for the Falcons in 1977. Prior to the 1978 season, Spiva was the top middle linebacker on Atlanta's depth chart before suffering a preseason knee injury. He underwent surgery to repair torn ligaments a few days after sustaining the injury.

On April 3, 1979, Spiva was driving in rainy conditions when his sports car slid off of a street in the Atlanta area and it collided with a tree. Spiva died at Northside Hospital that day after sustaining head and chest injuries. His teammate Garth TenNapel was seriously injured in the crash. Spiva and TenNapel had been close friends since going through knee rehabilitation together the previous year.

References

1955 births
1979 deaths
Tennessee Volunteers football players
People from Chattanooga, Tennessee
People from Chamblee, Georgia
Sportspeople from DeKalb County, Georgia
Atlanta Falcons players
American football linebackers
Road incident deaths in Georgia (U.S. state)